Derek Robert Smith (born July 31, 1954) is a Canadian former professional ice hockey player who played in the National Hockey League with the Buffalo Sabres and Detroit Red Wings between 1975 and 1983. He was selected by the Sabres in the 1974 NHL Amateur Draft.

Playing career
Smith was born in Quebec City, Quebec, but grew up in Ottawa, Ontario.

Smith played his junior hockey for the Ottawa 67's and scored an impressive 52 goals in the 1972–73 campaign. He backed up the performance with a 47-goal season the next year and this was enough to garner the attention of the Buffalo Sabres who drafted him in the 10th round of the 1974 NHL Amateur Draft.

He spent three seasons with the Hershey Bears of the American Hockey League including a playoff effort in 1975 where he scored seven goals in eleven games. Smith also scored nearly a point a game for the Bears in 1976–77. This is also the year when he made his regular season debut in the NHL, playing in 5 games for the Sabres, after appearing in one playoff game for the Sabres the year before.

In 1977, he became an NHL regular appearing in 36 regular season games and an additional eight playoff games. Smith broke out in the 1979–80 season when he recorded career high 24 goals to go with 39 assists. He also scored 12 points in 13 games. He was a 20-goal scorer the next season. Smith also set a career high with 43 assists in 69 games.

On December 2, 1981 Smith was part of a blockbuster trade that sent him to the Detroit Red Wings, along with Danny Gare and Jim Schoenfeld, in exchange for Dale McCourt, Mike Foligno and Brent Peterson. Smith scored thirteen goals playing for Detroit. He retired from professional hockey in 1984 after scoring 78 goals and 194 points in the NHL.

Smith still resides in the Western New York area and is an active member of the Buffalo Sabres Alumni Association.

Career statistics

Regular season and playoffs

References

External links
 
 Sports Illustrated article
 Buffalo Sabres alumni page

1954 births
Living people
Adirondack Red Wings players
Anglophone Quebec people
Buffalo Sabres draft picks
Buffalo Sabres players
Canadian ice hockey forwards
Charlotte Checkers (SHL) players
Detroit Red Wings players
Hershey Bears players
Houston Aeros draft picks
Ice hockey people from Ottawa
Ice hockey people from Quebec City
Ottawa 67's players